Alvin D. Reed (born August 1, 1944) is a former professional American football player.  A 6'5", 232 lbs. tight end from Prairie View A&M University, after being drafted by the American Football League's Houston Oilers in 1967, Reed played nine seasons in professional football, from 1967–1975.

See also
Other American Football League players

1944 births
Living people
People from Kilgore, Texas
American Football League All-Star players
American football tight ends
Houston Oilers players
Prairie View A&M Panthers football players
Washington Redskins players
American Football League players